Jacob Harold Gallinger (March 28, 1837 – August 17, 1918), was a United States senator from New Hampshire who served as President pro tempore of the Senate in 1912 and 1913.

Early life and career
Jacob Harold Gallinger was born in Cornwall, Ontario, British Canada on March 28, 1837. His father's family were German and his mother's was German American.

He was home-schooled from an early age.

Gallinger moved to the U.S. at an early age and first worked as a printer.

Medical career 
Gallinger studied medicine at the Cincinnati Eclectic Medical Institute and graduated at the head of his class in May 1858. He studied abroad for three years, writing and working as a printer to cover his expenses. In 1861, he returned to the United States and engaged in the practice of homeopathic medicine and surgery in Keene, New Hampshire before moving to Concord, New Hampshire in April 1862. He practiced medicine actively until 1885.

He was an active member of the American Institute of Homeopathy  from 1868–80, and throughout his political career, he was a forthright advocate of the homeopathic school of thought and practice.  Besides the AIH, he was a member of many state and national medical societies and a frequent contributor to the journals of his profession. He was on the board of trustees of Columbia Hospital for Women, and a member of the board of visitors to Providence Hospital.

Early political career

State legislature 
Gallinger was elected to the New Hampshire House of Representatives in 1872 and re-elected in 1873. He served as a member of the state constitutional convention in 1876. He was then elected to the New Hampshire Senate and served from 1878 to 1880. In 1879, he was elected Senate President.

He became surgeon general of New Hampshire under Governor Natt Head, with the rank of brigadier general, from 1879 to 1880. In 1882, he was elected chairman of the New Hampshire Republican Party and remained in that role until his resignation in 1890.

United States House of Representatives 
In 1884, Gallinger was elected to the United States House of Representatives, serving from March 4, 1885, to March 3, 1889, but declined to be a candidate for reelection in 1888.

In 1888, Gallinger served as chairman of the New Hampshire delegation to the Republican National Convention at Chicago, where he seconded the nomination of Benjamin Harrison of Indiana for President.

United States Senate 
In 1890, Gallinger was elected to the New Hampshire House again, but served only a short time before the legislature elected him to the United States Senate in 1891. He was reelected by the legislature without Republican opposition in 1897, 1903 and 1909, and by popular vote in 1914. He served from March 4, 1891, until his death in Franklin, New Hampshire in 1918.

As Senator, Gallinger chaired the New Hampshire delegations to the Republican National Convention of 1888, 1900, 1904 and 1908, and for a time was a member of the Republican National Committee.

In 1898, Gallinger returned to the role of chairman of the New Hampshire Republican Party and was re-elected in 1900 and 1902. In 1901, he was also elected to represent New Hampshire on the Republican National Committee.

As Senator he was considered a master of parliamentary law and was frequently called upon to preside over the Senate. He was also an active public speaker in and out of the Senate.

He was President pro tempore during the Sixty-second Congress and was also Republican Conference chairman. He also chaired the Committee on Transportation Routes to the Seaboard, Committee on Pensions, Committee on the District of Columbia, and the Merchant Marine Commission. He was named a member of the National Forest Reservation Commission, established by the Weeks Act, which Gallinger sponsored in the Senate.

Personal life and death 
Gallinger received the honorary degree of A.M. from Dartmouth College in 1885 and served as trustee of George Washington University for several years. He was interred at Blossom Hill Cemetery, Concord.

See also
List of United States Congress members who died in office (1900–49)
List of United States senators born outside the United States

Notes

References

 American National Biography
 Dictionary of American Biography
 Schlup, Leonard.  "Consistent Conservative: Jacob Harold Gallinger and the Presidential Campaign of 1912 in New Hampshire." International Review of History and Political Science 21 (August 1984): 49-57.
 U.S. Congress. Memorial Services for Jacob Harold Gallinger. 65th Cong., 3rd sess., 1918-1919. Washington, D.C.: Government Printing Office, 1919.
 
 
 
 
 Jacob H. Gallinger, late a representative from New Hampshire, Memorial addresses delivered in the House of Representatives and Senate frontispiece 1919

1837 births
Pre-Confederation Canadian emigrants to the United States
1918 deaths
Republican Party members of the New Hampshire House of Representatives
People from Cornwall, Ontario
Chairpersons of the New Hampshire Republican State Committee
Republican Party United States senators from New Hampshire
Presidents of the New Hampshire Senate
Republican Party New Hampshire state senators
Republican Party members of the United States House of Representatives from New Hampshire
19th-century American politicians
Presidents pro tempore of the United States Senate